The 1960 New Mexico Lobos football team represented the University of New Mexico in the Skyline Conference during the 1960 NCAA University Division football season.  In their first season under head coach Bill Weeks, the Lobos compiled a 5–5 record (4–2 against Skyline opponents), finished fourth in the conference, and outscored all opponents by a total of 234 to 182.

The 1960 season was the first in which the Lobos played their home games in the newly-constructed University Stadium. The first game in the new stadium was a 77–6 victory over University of Mexico witnessed by a record crowd of 24,085 persons.

The team's statistical leaders included Jim Cromartie with 343 passing yards and Bobby Santiago with 596 rushing yards and 187 receiving yards.

Schedule

References

New Mexico
New Mexico Lobos football seasons
New Mexico Lobos football